The Women's Hockey Junior Asia Cup is a women's international under-21 field hockey tournament organized by the Asian Hockey Federation. The tournament has been held since 1992 and serves as a qualification tournament for the Junior World Cup.

China are the defending champions winning the 2015 edition.

Results

Summary

* = host nation

Team appearances

See also
 Men's Hockey Junior Asia Cup
 Women's Hockey Asia Cup
 Women's Junior AHF Cup

References

External links
Asian Hockey Federation
todor66.com archive

 
Junior Asia Cup
Field hockey
Junior Hockey Asia Cup
Asia Cup